The first season of the Singaporean reality talent show Project SuperStar began on 22 June 2005 on MediaCorp Channel U. The show is hosted by Quan Yi Fong and Jeff Wang. The overall winner and runner-up received a talent management contract with Play Music and Universal Music Singapore respectively, together with MediaCorp. Billy Koh, Lee Wei Song, Roy Loi, Anthony Png and Dawn Yip were employed as the judges for the season.

On 1 September 2005, winner of the male category Kelvin Tan was announced as the overall winner of the season with a 64%-36% final vote, with female category winner Kelly Poon as the overall runner-up.

This season saw a profound success, and was introduced to a few contestants who would later become successful artistes: Darryl Yong who would later become a full-time Mediacorp artiste after participating another competition, Star Search, five years later in 2010, as well as Chen Jia Xin, Chew Sin Huey, Derrick Hoh, Hong Jun Yang, Sugianto and Hagen Tan, all of which became profound musicians in Singapore.

Judges and hosts

Development
Over 4,000 aspirants auditioned for the competition when it was announced.

Finalists
Key:
 – Winner
 – Runner-up
 – Gender/Category runner-up
 – Semi-finalist
 – Category 6th-8th place (lost wildcard)
 – Advanced via wildcard

Live shows

Live show details

Week 1: Quarter-final 1 (22/23 June)
Themes: Contestant duets; no theme

Week 2: Quarter-final 2 (29/30 June)
Themes: Contestant duets; no theme

Week 3: Quarter-final 3 (6/7 July)
Themes: Contestant duets; no theme

Week 4: Quarter-final 4 (13/14 July)
Themes: Contestant duets; no theme

Week 5: Revival round (20/21 July)
Themes: Contestant duets; no theme

Week 6: Semi-final 1 (27/28 July)
Themes: "Slow" song; "fast" song
Group performance: "C'est Si Bon"

Week 7: Semi-final 2 (3/4 August)
Theme: Oldies remakes
Group performance: "冬天里的一把火"

Week 8: Semi-final 3 (10/11 August)
Theme: Songs from local drama series; songs by local artist
Group performance: "一起走到"

Week 9: Category final (17/18 August)
Themes: "Slow-to-fast transition" songs; English songs; winner's single
Group performance: "制造浪漫"

Week 10: Final prelude (24/25 August)

Note: For some unknown reason, Candy Tan was absent from the show.

Week 11: Final (1 September)
Themes: "Crowd control" songs; unplugged songs; JJ Lin duets; newly penned songs; winner's song
Group performances: "Super Star" (all finalists except Hagen Tan and Candy Tan), "风云变色" / "野蛮游戏" / "爱的Bubble" (Finalists eliminated in the quarter-finals except Hagen Tan and Candy Tan), "Guardian Angel" (performed by Hong Jun Yang), "感谢你用心爱我" (performed by Chew Sin Huey), "屋顶" (performed by Chew Sin Huey and Hong Jun Yang), "My Anata" / "808" / "痛快" (Finalists eliminated in the semi-finals)
Musical guest: JJ Lin ("简简单单" / "豆浆油条" / "编号89757")

 The performance featured backing vocals from Leon Lim, Derrick Hoh, Hong Jun Yang, Sugianto, and William Tan.
 The song was later re-released as 下雪, with the same tune but different lyrics, and is sung by A-do.
 The performance featured backing vocals from Chen Jia Xin, Chew Sin Huey, Chanel Pang, Sandra Ter, and Candyce Toh.

References

External links
 Official website

2005 Singaporean television seasons